Amber Maximus (born 12 January 1997) is a Belgian footballer. She plays as a forward for RSC Anderlecht and the Belgium women's national football team.

International statistics
As of 20 October 2016

References

External links
 

1997 births
Living people
Belgian women's footballers
Belgium women's international footballers
Women's association football forwards
K.A.A. Gent (women) players
Super League Vrouwenvoetbal players
BeNe League players
RSC Anderlecht (women) players
Belgium women's youth international footballers